Dirk Hupe (born 29 May 1957) is a retired German footballer who played as a central defender.

External links

1957 births
Living people
German footballers
Borussia Dortmund players
Arminia Bielefeld players
Bundesliga players
2. Bundesliga players
Association football defenders
People from Solingen
Sportspeople from Düsseldorf (region)
Footballers from North Rhine-Westphalia